Gorelord is a Norwegian death metal band which uses horror movie-like themes in its music. It is the one man side project of Frediablo of the band Necrophagia. Contrary to some reports, Gorelord is based in Oslo, Norway. In September 2005 Frediablo issued a statement saying he was quitting Necrophagia among all of his music projects and bands he was involved in, except for Grimfist. He was also a member of Wurdulak, Hemnur, Soul Forsaken, Ave Sathanas, Blodkrig, Deride and was a session member in Svartpest.

History
Gorelord released the album Force Fed on Human Flesh in 2001. Frediablo performed vocals, guitar and bass, whilst Jehmod played drums. Killjoy from Necrophagia and Maniac from Mayhem provided guest vocals on the track "Hells Kitchen".

Gorelord's second album Zombie Suicide: Part 666 was released in 2002. Frediablo performed vocals, guitar and bass and drumming was provided by DNA. The album included two bonus demo tracks from the first Gorelord demo, House of Unholy Terror.

After a four-year hiatus, Norwegian Chainsaw Massacre was released in 2006. On Norwegian Chainsaw Massacre, Frediablo played guitar and bass, provided vocals and programmed the drum machine. Journalist Dom Lawson provided guest vocals on the track "Glorification of violence".

On 7 May 2007, via his MySpace page, Frediablo announced that he had started pre-production on a new Gorelord album, titled Chapter IV - Hellbound, which will feature Mirai from Sigh on some instrumental tracks. The album will feature 12 tracks including "Horror vs Hell", "Punctured Skin", "Inside a Madman's Mind" and "Spiked Ignorance". The album was due for release in 2008, but has yet to be released.

A raw, unmixed version of the track "Bloodshot Cadaver Apocalypse" was released on the official Gorelord Myspace on 24 December 2007.

Discography

Studio albums
2001 - Force Fed on Human Flesh
2002 - Zombie Suicide: Part 666
2006 - Norwegian Chainsaw Massacre

Other releases
1999 - The House of Unholy Terror (demo)
2001 - Creature Feature (split EP)
2002 - Creature Feature Vol II (split EP)
2005 - Drunk, Damned & Decayed (DVD)

References

External links
 Gorelord official website
 Gorelord official Myspace

Norwegian death metal musical groups
Musical groups established in 1999
1999 establishments in Norway
Musical groups from Oslo
Season of Mist artists